This is an incomplete list of notable Muslims who live or lived in the United States.

Academia

Asad Abidi – Professor of Electrical Engineering at the University of California, Los Angeles; member of the National Academy of Engineering
Gul Agha  –  Professor of Computer Science at the University of Illinois at Urbana-Champaign
Akbar S. Ahmed – US resident Pakistani anthropologist; the Ibn Khaldun Chair of Islamic Studies at American University; producer of the film Journey Into Europe, on Islam in Europe
Saleem H. Ali – environmental researcher and Associate Dean for Graduate studies at the University of Vermont's Rubenstein School of Environment and Natural Resources; writer and contributor to publications such as the International Herald Tribune; has dual American and Pakistani citizenship
Talal Asad – Professor of Anthropology and Religious Studies at CUNY
Farooq Azam – Distinguished Professor at Scripps Institution of Oceanography, UCSD; researcher in the field of marine microbiology
Ayesha Jalal – MacArthur Fellow and Richardson Professor of History at Tufts University
Mohammad Aslam Khan Khalil – Professor of Physics at Portland State University; a highly cited researcher in the field of atmospheric physics
Sadaf Jaffer – the first female Muslim American mayor, first female South Asian mayor, and first female Pakistani-American mayor in the United States, of Montgomery in Somerset County, New Jersey.
Hafeez Malik  –  Professor of Political Science at Villanova University, in Pennsylvania
 Nergis Mavalvala, Kathleen Marble Professor of Astrophysics at the Massachusetts Institute of Technology (MIT), and 2010 MacArthur Fellow; part of the team that made the first direct gravitational wave observation
Zia Mian – physicist
Adil Najam – Professor of Geography and International Relations and Director of the Pardee Center at Boston University; founding editor of popular blog Pakistaniat
 S. Hamid Nawab, Professor of Electrical and Computer Engineering and Biomedical Engineering, Boston University; co-author of widely used textbook Signals and Systems (1997), published by Prentice Hall (Pearson); researcher in signal processing and machine perception with application to auditory, speech, and neuromuscular systems
Anwar Shaikh – Professor of Economics at the graduate faculty of The New School in New York City
 Sara Suleri – Professor of English at Yale University
Abdul Jamil Tajik – researcher in clinical medicine
 Muhammad Suhail Zubairy – Professor in the Department of Physics and Astronomy; holder of the Munnerlyn-Heep Chair in Quantum Optics at the Texas A&M University

Activism and politics

Huma Abedin – aide to United States Secretary of State Hillary Clinton; served as traveling chief of staff during Clinton's campaign for the Democratic nomination in the 2008 presidential election
Saqib Ali – served as delegate to the Maryland House of Delegates, elected in 2006, represented the 39th District
 Tahir Ali – first Pakistani American elected as a National delegate-at-large (R) from Massachusetts, 1992
Arif Alikhan – former appointee to the Obama Administration where he served as Assistant Secretary for Policy Development at the United States Department of Homeland Security; former Deputy Mayor of Homeland Security and Public Safety for the City of Los Angeles; visiting Professor of Homeland Security and Counterterrorism at the National Defense University's (NDU) College of International Security Affairs in Washington, DC
Nihad Awad – National Executive Director of the Council on American-Islamic Relations
André Carson – Congressman from Indiana
Shamila N. Chaudhary – US government policy adviser
Robert D. Crane – former foreign policy advisor; author
Sada Cumber – first US envoy to the Organisation of the Islamic Conference
Keith Ellison – first Muslim congressman from Minnesota
Louis Farrakhan - leader of the Nation of Islam
George Bethune English (1787-1828) – American adventurer, diplomat, soldier, and convert to Islam.
Ibrahim Hooper – National Communications Director for the Council on American-Islamic Relations (CAIR)
Mansoor Ijaz – hedge fund manager and venture capitalist involved in Pakistan–United States relations and peace efforts surrounding the Kashmir conflict
Arsalan Iftikhar – human rights lawyer, global media commentator, and author of the book Scapegoats: How Islamophobia Helps Our Enemies & Threatens Our Freedoms
Noor Al-Hussein – anti-nuclear weapons proliferation advocate and former Queen consort of Jordan
Hakim Jamal – civil rights activist; Member of the Nation of Islam but converted to traditional Islam after the assassination of his cousin Malcolm X.
Zalmay Khalilzad – former US Ambassador to the United Nations; former U.S. Ambassador to Iraq and Afghanistan
Yuri Kochiyama – Japanese American activist who converted to Sunni Islam from Protestantism in 1971
Umar Lee – Activist and Writer
Edina Lekovic – Communications Director of the Muslim Public Affairs Council
Gholam Mujtaba  –  chair of the Pakistan Policy Institute, a think tank dedicated to improve the US-Pakistan relationship
Ilhan Omar – One of the first two Muslim women elected to Congress.
Farah Pandith – Special Representative to Muslim Communities for the US Department of State; official advisor to President Obama on Muslim matters
Zahid Quraishi – First United States federal district court judge in the United States
Zainab Salbi – co-founder and president for Women for Women International 
Betty Shabazz (also known as Betty X) – civil rights activist and educator; widow of Malcolm X
Ilyasah Shabazz – social activist and daughter of Malcolm X
Malcolm Shabazz – activist and grandson of Malcolm X; Murdered during a labor rights tour in Mexico
el-Hajj Malik el-Shabazz (also known as Malcolm X) – human rights activist, civil rights activist, public speaker and Black Muslim minister; Joined the Nation of Islam in 1952, before converting to Sunni Islam in 1964.
Azadeh Shahshahani – human rights attorney and past president of the National Lawyers Guild
 Saghir "Saggy" Tahir – New Hampshire State Representative; the only elected Pakistani American in the Republican Party; re-elected in 2006 for a fourth term to represent Ward 2, District 9 in his home town of Manchester
Shirin R. Tahir-Kheli – White House appointee at various senior posts in the executive branch and the State department during five Republican administrations.
Rashida Tlaib – One of the first two Muslim women elected to Congress.
James Yee – former U.S. Army chaplain with the rank of Captain
Elias Zerhouni – Director, National Institutes of Health

Armed forces
Kareem Rashad Sultan Khan – United States Army Soldier killed in Iraq
Humayun Khan – United States Army Soldier killed in Iraq

Foreign military service
 Ma Dunjing – Chinese Muslim General of the National Revolutionary Army, immigrated to Los Angeles in the United States after retirement in 1950
 Ma Hongkui – Chinese Muslim General of the National Revolutionary Army, immigrated to Los Angeles in the United States after retirement in 1950

Art

Kameelah Janan Rasheed — Artist based in New York City
Deana Haggag – Egyptian-American art museum curator, President and CEO of United States Artists in Chicago
Shirin Neshat – Iranian-American visual artist and film director. Awarded The Dorothy and Lillian Gish Prize in 2006, and the Silver Lion in 2009
Shahzia Sikander – Pakistani-American artist and MacArthur Fellow
Minoosh Zomorodinia – Iranian-born American visual artist and curator

Business

Javed Ahmed – former chief executive of Tate & Lyle, a FTSE 250 company and one of Britain's oldest brands
Michael Chowdry (1955–2001) – Forbes 400 businessman; founder of air cargo company Atlas Air, which in 2001 was worth over $1.39 billion
Mohamed El-Erian – chief economic adviser of Allianz, the parent company of PIMCO, where El-Erian was CEO and manager of over $1 trillion in global assets; president of Queens' College, Cambridge
Tariq Farid – founder and chief executive of Edible Arrangements
Nabeel Gareeb – president and chief executive of renewable energy company MEMC (now SunEdison) from 2002 to 2008; ranked 6th highest-earning U.S. CEO in 2008
 Fred Hassan – chairman of investment company Caret Group, director of private equity firm Warburg Pincus, former chief executive of pharmaceutical companies including Schering-Plough from 2003–2009, when the company completed its merger with Merck & Co.
Mansoor Ijaz – founder and chairman of Crescent Investment Management, television commentator
Jawed Karim – co-founder of YouTube
Farooq Kathwari – chairman, president and chief executive of Ethan Allen
Shahid Khan – owner of sports teams the Jacksonville Jaguars and Fulham F.C., and autoparts maker Flex-N-Gate, lead investor in All Elite Wrestling
Safi Qureshey – co-founder and former CEO of AST Research, philanthropist
Hamdi Ulukaya – billionaire founder and chief executive of foods maker Chobani; activist and philanthropist, signed the Giving Pledge to donate the majority of his wealth, founded the Tent Foundation, received the UN Global Leadership Award and the Global Citizen Prize

Comedy

Ahmed Ahmed – standup comedian, actor
Mohammed Amer – standup comedian
Dave Chappelle – standup comedian (converted in 1998)
Negin Farsad – comedian, actress, writer, filmmaker
Maz Jobrani – standup comedian, actor
Aasif Mandvi – comedian, actor
Hasan Minhaj – comedian, Daily Show correspondent
Preacher Moss – standup comedian, comedy writer
Zahra Noorbakhsh – comedian, writer, actor, co-host of #GoodMuslimBadMuslim podcast
Dean Obeidallah – standup comedian
Azhar Usman – standup comedian
Maysoon Zayid – standup comedian, actress

Crime

Hasan Akbar – convicted of premeditated murder in a grenade attack on fellow soldiers
Hesham Mohamed Hadayet – Egyptian-American who killed 2 people at the El Al counter at Los Angeles International Airport
Wadih el-Hage – al-Qaeda member serving life imprisonment in the US for his part in the 1998 United States embassy bombings
Mujahid Abdul Halim – Served 45 years in prison for taking part in the assassination of Malcolm X; Long-time member of the Nation of Islam but converted to traditional Islam while in prison.
Nidal Hasan – former soldier convicted of the 2009 Fort Hood shooting
Muzzammil Hassan – founder of Bridges TV, a Muslim television network; received sentence of 25 to life for killing his wife
Mir Aimal Kansi – Pakistani-American convicted and executed for the shootings at the Central Intelligence Agency headquarters
John Walker Lindh – member of the Taliban
John Allen Muhammad – executed beltway sniper
José Padilla – convicted of aiding terrorists and litigant before the United States Supreme Court in Rumsfeld v. Padilla
Dzhokhar Tsarnaev – Kyrgyzstani-American citizen who was convicted of planting bombs at the Boston Marathon on April 15, 2013, together with his brother Tamerlan Tsarnaev.
Bryant Neal Vinas – convicted of participating in and supporting al-Qaeda plots in Afghanistan and the U.S.

Film

Nabil Abou-Harb – filmmaker; writer and director of Arab in America
Shohreh Aghdashloo – Academy Award-nominated Iranian-born actress
Moustapha Akkad – film director, producer
Mahershala Ali – Oscar-winning actor.
Lewis Arquette – film actor, writer, and producer
Sayed Badreya – actor, filmmaker
Saïd Taghmaoui – actor
Faran Tahir – actor

Modeling

Halima Aden – Somali-American fashion model
Iman – supermodel and widow of David Bowie
Bella Hadid – fashion model and daughter of real-estate developer Mohamed Hadid and former model Yolanda Hadid

Music

Ahmad Jamal – jazz pianist
Ahmet Ertegün – Songwriter and founder of Atlantic Records
Akon – R&B and hip-hop artist
Ali Shaheed Muhammad – producer, DJ and rapper, formerly of A Tribe Called Quest; Sunni Muslim
Art Blakey – jazz drummer and bandleader
Beanie Sigel – rapper
Brother Ali – rapper; converted to Islam
Chali 2na – rapper, formerly of the alternative hip-hop group Jurassic 5, and of Ozomatli
DJ Khaled – rap artist and DJ
Everlast – rapper from the Irish-American hip-hop group House of Pain; converted to Islam
Freeway – rapper; Sunni Muslim
Ghostface Killah – rapper, member of the hip-hip group the Wu-Tang Clan
Ice Cube – rapper and producer
Jermaine Jackson – singer, bass guitarist
Kevin Gates – rapper
Lupe Fiasco – rapper; Sunni Muslim
MC Ren – rapper
Mona Haydar rapper; Sunni Muslim
Mos Def – rapper; initially joined the Nation of Islam before converting to Islam
Napoleon – former member of Tupac Shakur's rap group the Outlawz, now a motivational Muslim speaker
Native Deen – rap group
Q-Tip – rapper, formerly of A Tribe Called Quest; Sunni Muslim
Raekwon – rapper, member of the hip-hip group the Wu-Tang Clan
Rhymefest – Grammy Award-winning hip-hop artist; co-writer of the single "Jesus Walks"
Richard Thompson – British folk rock singer, Sufi Muslim since 1974
Scarface – rapper
 Vinnie Paz – rapper in the hip-hop group Jedi Mind Tricks
Yusef Lateef – jazz musician and Grammy Award winner

Religion

 Abu Ammar Yasir Qadhi – Muslim Scholar. 
Omar Suleiman – Muslim activist and Imam.
Dalia Mogahed – Muslim speaker and activist.
Yasmin Mogahed – Muslim speaker and activist.
Jonathan A C Brown – Muslim lecturer and scholar.
amina wadud - Islamic scholar and activist
Suhaib Webb – Muslim lecturer and activist; Imam of the Islamic Society of Boston Cultural Center, the largest mosque in the New England area 
Hamza Yusuf – Muslim scholar
Hassan Hathout – Muslim scholar
Hassan Al-Qazwini – Muslim scholar
Hisham Kabbani – Muslim sufi scholar and shaykh
Yusuf Estes – Muslim preacher
Souleiman Ghali – Founder of the Islamic Society of San Francisco
Sherman Jackson – Muslim scholar
Nouman Ali Khan – Muslim speaker and founder, CEO and lead instructor at Bayyinah, the Institute for Arabic and Qur'anic Studies.
Sadullah Khan – Muslim scholar
Ingrid Mattson – Muslim scholar
Warith Deen Mohammed – former leader of the largest Muslim organization, the American Society of Muslims (son of Nation of Islam leader)
Abdul Malik Mujahid – Imam, community activist supporting interfaith and progressive causes, president of Sound Vision
Louay M. Safi – Muslim scholar
Zaid Shakir – Muslim scholar
Siraj Wahhaj – Muslim scholar
Omar Khalidi – Muslim scholar
 Amir Hussain – Muslim scholar, editor of the Journal of the American Academy of Religion
 Asifa Quraishi - Muslim legal scholar 
 Azizah al-Hibri - Muslim legal scholar 
 Laleh Bakhtiar - translator of the Quran

Science
Shereef Elnahal – commissioner, New Jersey Department of Health, transitioning to CEO of University Hospital, Newark in July 2019
Fazlur Khan – structural engineer (designed the Sears Tower, John Hancock Center)
Ayub K. Ommaya – neurosurgeon, inventor of the Ommaya reservoir
Ahmed Zewail – Nobel Prize winner in Chemistry, 1999 for his work on femtochemistry
Aziz Sancar – Nobel Prize winner in Chemistry, 2015 along with Tomas Lindahl and Paul L. Modrich for their mechanistic studies of DNA repair
Anousheh Ansari - engineer and first person of Iranian descent in space

Sports

Boxing

Muhammad Ali – became a member of the Nation of Islam in 1964, converted to Sunni Islam in 1975
Bernard Hopkins – former Middleweight and Light Heavyweight world champion
Eddie Mustafa Muhammad – former Light Heavyweight Champion
Matthew Saad Muhammad – former Light Heavyweight Champion
Dwight Muhammad Qawi – former Light Heavyweight and Cruiserweight Champion
Hasim Rahman – former Heavyweight champion
Mike Tyson – Undisputed Heavyweight Champion in 1987; converted in 1994 (influenced by preacher in prison)

Basketball

DeSagana Diop – Senegalese basketball player for the Charlotte Bobcats 
Kareem Abdul-Jabbar – converted to Islam from Catholicism in 1968, initially joining the Nation of Islam before retaking the Shahada and converting to Sunni Islam that very summer
Enes Kanter – Turkish basketball player for the Portland Trail Blazers
Mahmoud Abdul-Rauf – former player for Denver Nuggets (converted in 1991, formerly Chris Jackson)
Shareef Abdur-Rahim – retired player, named NBA All-Star in 2001–02 season
Hassan Adams – drafted by and played for the New Jersey Nets, later the Cleveland Cavaliers, then KK Vojvodina (in Serbia).
Larry Johnson – retired player, played for the Charlotte Hornets and New York Knicks
Nazr Mohammed – player for the Charlotte Bobcats
Mehmet Okur – Turkish player of the Utah Jazz
Shaquille O'Neal – former player for the Los Angeles Lakers; rapper and actor
Hakeem Olajuwon – former player for the Houston Rockets
Rasheed Wallace – former player for the Detroit Pistons
Kyrie Irving - player for Brooklyn Nets

NFL

Ameer Abdullah – running back, drafted by the Detroit Lions in 2015, currently with the Minnesota Vikings
Oday Aboushi – guard, drafted by the New York Jets in 2013, currently with the Detroit Lions.
Dominique Easley – linebacker, drafted by the New England Patriots in 2014, currently a free agent.
Mohamed Sanu – wide receiver, drafted by the Cincinnati Bengals in 2012, currently with the San Francisco 49ers 
Muhammad Wilkerson – defensive end, drafted by the New York Jets in 2011, currently a free agent.
Hamza Abdullah – former safety for the Cleveland Browns
Husain Abdullah – former safety for the Minnesota Vikings
Az-Zahir Hakim – former wide receiver for the St. Louis Rams
Ryan Harris – former offensive tackle for the Pittsburgh Steelers.
Abdul Hodge – former linebacker for the Carolina Panthers
Ahmad Rashad – former wide receiver for Minnesota Vikings, award-winning sportscaster (converted in 1972)
Ephraim Salaam – former offensive tackle for the Detroit Lions

Track and field

 Khalid Khannouchi – marathon runner
 Dalilah Muhammad - Olympic gold and silver medalist

Wrestling
Adeel Alam – Pakistani American, wrestler in WWE
Khosrow Vaziri – Retired Iranian American wrestler, former WWE Champion

Mixed martial arts
Muhammed Lawal – former Strikeforce Light Heavyweight World Champion
Kamaru Usman – current UFC Welterweight Champion

Television

 Mara Brock Akil – screenwriter, producer
 Usman Ally – actor
 Ahmed Shihab-Eldin – reporter for national news channels
 Zehra Fazal - actress and comedienne
 Rizwan Manji – actor
 Ayman Mohyeldin – reporter for national news channels
 Isaiah Mustafa – actor
 Mehmet Oz – medical doctor, talk show host
 Kamran Pasha – screenwriter, producer
 Tahera Rahman – Newscaster for WHBF-TV and KLJB. Widely covered by the media for being the first American hijabi Muslim newscaster.
 Iqbal Theba – actor
 Ali Velshi – Reporter and anchor for national U.S. news channels, from Canada
 Ramy Youssef - Actor and comedian

Writing

 Reza Aslan – author, religious scholar
 Mona Eltahawy – columnist
 Yahiya Emerick – author
 Hafsah Faizal – Author of youth literature, of Sri Lankan and Arab descent.

Saladin Ahmed – author
Hafsah Faizal - fantasy novelist
Laila Lalami – author and essayist
 Ayman Mohyeldin – Al-Jazeera English journalist
 Stephen Schwartz – journalist
 Michael Wolfe – journalist
 Fareed Zakaria – author, commentator, and host of CNN's Fareed Zakaria GPS
Khaled Hosseini – Novelist, physician
Melody Moezzi – author and activist
Wael Abdelgawad – author
G. Willow Wilson - comics writer and author 
Etaf Rum - Novelist

See also
Glossary of Islamic terms in Arabic
List of converts to Islam
List of Islamic and Muslim related topics
Lists of Muslims
Lists of people by belief
Taqwacore

References

Bibliography
 

Lists of Muslims
 
Lists of American people